The Sheraton Mexico City Maria Isabel Hotel is a business hotel operated by Sheraton Hotels and Resorts and located on Paseo de la Reforma in the Zona Rosa business and shopping district just across from El Ángel de la Independencia in Mexico City.

History

The Maria Isabel Hotel was built in 1962 by Bolivian tycoon Antenor Patiño. He named the hotel for his late daughter, Maria Isabel Patiño de Goldsmith, who died in 1954, at the age of 17, from complications in the seventh month of pregnancy, after eloping with 20-year-old British heir James Goldsmith. The hotel was designed by renowned Mexican architect Juan Sordo Madaleno, working with architects José Villagrán García, Ricardo Legorreta, and José Adolfo Wiechers. In April 1963 the Maria Isabel was taken over by Mexican hotel magnate Cesar Balsa's Balsa Hotels. In November 1963, Balsa Hotels became represented by Sheraton Hotels in the US.

In 1969 the Maria Isabel was sold to Sheraton. They renamed it the Maria Isabel-Sheraton Hotel and added a new rear tower, designed by Mexican architect Manuel De Santiago-de Borbón González Bravo (great-grandson of Queen Isabella II of Spain), increasing the number of rooms from 502 to 747. The hotel was later renamed the Sheraton Maria Isabel Hotel and Towers.

Controversy

On February 4, 2006 this hotel was involved in an international incident when a group of Cuban delegates were expelled from the hotel upon pressure from the United States Department of Commerce to enforce the embargo against Cuba. This act, however, is in violation of the 1996 Law of Protection of Commerce and Investments from Foreign Policies that Contravene International Law that prohibits companies that are located in Mexico from blocking commerce and investments that are caused by the application of foreign laws.

Hotel Sheraton released a statement, on February 8, denying discrimination based on national origin. They also mentioned that the rooms were booked and paid for by an American company it could not possibly have kept any funds and send them to the government of the United States.

The unit of the government of Mexico responsible for the protection of consumers, the Procuraduría Federal del Consumidor (Profeco), declared it is unable to close the hotel because such measure is only applicable on repeated violations. However, it has estimated a fine for the hotel for up to a million pesos (roughly 96,000 dollars) but none of the Cuban officials had presented a complaint.

After this incident, a written complaint of zoning violations was presented to the borough delegate, Virginia Jaramillo of the Party of the Democratic Revolution, of Cuauhtémoc, D.F., the borough of Federal District (D.F.) where the hotel is located. After a revision it was found that the hotel was in violation of zoning regulations because of 3,000 unauthorized square meters and lack of parking spaces. After this revision the borough delegate of Cuauhtémoc declared the closing of this establishment to be imminent. Other violations such as lack of restaurant menus in Braille may be corrected by the deadline given by the delegate, but Jaramillo explains it is impossible to destroy part of the building or to build more parking spaces before that time.

See also

 List of hotels in Mexico
 List of companies of Mexico

Notes

External links
Official website
The Sheraton is not an isolated case by Gabriel Molina

Hotels in Mexico City
Hotels established in 1962
Sheraton hotels
Hotel buildings completed in 1962